Le Français, formerly the Kaskelot, is a three-masted barque and one of the largest remaining wooden ships in commission.

History

Danish flag
The Kaskelot was built in 1948 by J. Ring-Andersen for the Royal Greenland Trading Company, to carry supplies to remote coastal settlements in East Greenland. During the 1960s, Kaskelot worked as a support vessel for Danish fisheries in the Faroe Islands.

British flag
In 2007, for the bi-centennial celebration of Great Britain's ending the African slave trade, the ship was sailed up the Thames River to Tower Bridge in London to represent the Zong.  This slave ship, its crew and cargo of slaves figured in court proceedings in 1783 and became a symbol for the nation's anti-slavery movement because of the murder of 132 slaves during the voyage.

New owners purchased the ship in 2013 and undertook an extensive 8-month refit at T. Nielsen in Gloucester during which it was upgraded to comply with MCA MLC guidelines.  The ship is used for charter and commercial work around the UK.

French flag
In 2018, the Kaskelot is bought by Frédéric Lescure and brought under the French flag. She is now managed by the company Bob Escoffier Maritime. Then, the ship has been renamed Le Français, in hommage of the ship used by explorer Jean-Baptiste Charcot during his expedition in Antarctic (1903-1905).

Film credits 
Kaskelot has appeared in the following film and television productions:

 The Last Place on Earth (1985)
 Revolution (1985)
 Return to Treasure Island (1986)
 Without a Clue (1988)
 Shipwrecked (1990)
 The Three Musketeers (1993)
 Cutthroat Island (1995)
 Swept from the Sea (1997)
 A Respectable Trade (1998)
 David Copperfield (1999)
 Longitude (2000)
 Shackleton (2002)
 Amazing Grace (2006)
 Alice in Wonderland (2010)

References

 American Sail Training Association.  Sail Tall Ships! A Directory of Sail Training and Adventure at Sea 14th Edition.  Newport, RI: ASTA, 2002.

External links

 Tall Ship Kaskelot homepage

1948 ships
Ships built in Svendborg
Barques
Tall ships of France
Tall ships of the United Kingdom
Individual sailing vessels
Water transport in Cornwall
Tall ships